Deadly Care is a 1987 American made for television drama film starring Cheryl Ladd and Jason Miller.

Deadly Care was director David Anspaugh's last television film before directing the Academy Award-nominated film Hoosiers.

The film featured an original score by the band Tangerine Dream.

Plot

A critical care nurse abuses drugs and alcohol, causing her to make a near-fatal mistake in treating a patient.

Cast

 Cheryl Ladd as Anne Halloran
 Jason Miller as Dr. Miles Keefer
 Jennifer Salt as Carol
 Belinda Balaski as Terry
 Richard Evans as Jim
 Silvana Gallardo as Blanca Orella 
 Ann Hearn as Suze
 Peggy McCay as Mrs. Halloran
 Terrence E. McNally as Frank Halloran 
 Chris Mulkey as Richard Halloran
 Laurie O'Brien as Gloria 		
 Willard Pugh as Male Nurse
 John Hammond as Larry
 Arthur Taxier as Dr. Davidson
 Patricia Wilson as Marsha Foland
 Micole Mercurio as Greta
 Patrick Campbell as Mr. Skinner
 Troy Melton as Mr. Duffy
 Beth Grant as Madge
 Troy Evans as Dr. Derwin
 S. A. Griffin as The Stranger
 Paddi Edwards as Mrs. Kellerman
 Scott Richard Ehredt as Dr. Jackson
 Frank Biro as Mr. Cafarelli
 Phyllis Flax as Mrs. Reardon
 Ron Recasner as Dr. Mallory
 Patricia Huston as Marsha Foland
 John Christy Ewing as Dr. Lloyd Lucas
 John Howard Swain as Joel
 Gerry Gibson as Farther O'Brien
 Noel De Souza as Dr. Wasanta
 Joe Dorsey as Mr. Halloran
 Suzanne O'Donnell as Stewardess 
 Judy Jean Berns as Airport Clerk
 Daryl Wood as Woman in Elevator

Reception
The Sun-Sentinel wrote "Deadly Care may be remembered as a career footnote: as director David Anspaugh's last TV movie before making the Oscar-nominated feature Hoosiers."

References

External links

Deadly Care at Internet Archive

English-language television shows
1987 television films
1987 films
1987 drama films
American drama television films
Films directed by David Anspaugh
Films scored by Tangerine Dream
1980s English-language films